Arhopala matsutaroi is a butterfly of the family Lycaenidae first described by Hisakazu Hayashi in 1979. Its forewing length is 19 mm. It is endemic to the Philippines. It is uncommon and found only on Mindanao.

References

 Hayashi, Hisakazu., 1979: New Lycaenid Butterflies from Mindanao, the Philippines. Tyô to Ga. 30 (1,2): 83–90.
 Treadaway, Colin G., 1955: Checklist of the butterflies of the Philippine Islands. Nachrichten des Entomologischen Vereins Apollo, Suppl. 14: 7–118.
 
 , 2012: Revised checklist of the butterflies of the Philippine Islands (Lepidoptera: Rhopalocera). Nachrichten des Entomologischen Vereins Apollo, Suppl. 20: 1-64.

Arhopala
Lepidoptera of the Philippines
Butterflies described in 1978
Butterflies of Asia